Reacting games are educational role-playing games set in the past, with a focus on student debates about great texts.

History 

Reacting games developed as a genre of experiential education games in the United States in the late 1990s from work done by Mark Carnes at Barnard College.  

The prototype for these games is the Reacting to the Past series originally published by Pearson-Longman and currently published by W. W. Norton & Company and the Reacting Consortium Press. This pedagogy was originally developed for use in freshman seminar and history classes and quickly expanded into religion, political science, and science. Unlike the video games that are central to the serious games movement, reacting games rely almost entirely on reading, writing, and speaking. This quality of the games has made them effective for developing academic literacy, noted by the use of the games for English language education in Japan.
The dissemination of this pedagogy has largely been through annual national conferences held at Barnard College and regional conferences held at institutions throughout the United States.

Attributes 
Reacting games have the following attributes:

 Real historical setting
 Rich texts
 Multiple class meetings
 Roles with well-developed characters
 Victory objectives
 Indeterminacy
 Reading, writing, and speaking
 Narrative structure with drama
 Possibility of alternate historical outcomes
 Accessibility to non-specialists

Reacting games might also include the following common elements:

 Factions
 Elements of secrecy
 Opening vignettes
 Central texts

A growing number of reacting games also make use of in-game currency or Personal Interest Points (PIPs).

Game length

The earliest reacting games all centered around a single, classic text and were played during half or a third of a semester. As the format of reacting games evolved, the requirement for a classic text was dropped and shorter games emerged. At present, reacting games fall into the following categories:

Full games consist of 1-3 sessions of setup, 5-8 sessions of game-play, and 1-2 sessions for debriefing.

Short games consist of 1 session of setup, 2-3 sessions of game-play, and one session for debriefing. Many of these games are designed to replace a single textbook chapter and typically span a week of class.

Microgames consist of a single session of game-play, but usually require some setup and debriefing in the preceding and subsequent class sessions. A grant from the National Science Foundation launched a dozen new game prototypes with a shorter format. These are useful for conference workshops or for first-time reacting game players. They are meant to introduce the game format as much as they are to teach the content.

Relationship to other games and simulations

Case studies
Case studies have long been used in the medical, business, and legal education. They might involve discussion, debate, problem-based learning, or role-play. By contrast, reacting games require debate and role-play. Unlike case studies, reacting games also must be set in a true historical setting.

Live action role-playing
A live action role-playing games (LARP) has participants assuming roles and playing them out in costume. While reacting games do indeed have students playing historical roles, this rarely involves costumes. Reacting games are used for education while LARP is primarily used for recreation. In addition, while LARPs usually include a fantasy element, reacting games are historical.

Educational debating
In educational debate (or debate team), students competitively debate a topic following explicit rules. While educational debate involves only two teams ("for" and "against"), reacting games can involve multiple teams, including an undecided, indeterminate set of players. Educational debate also involves no role-playing and is not set in a historical setting. In addition, while debates focus on a single issue, reacting games feature multiple intellectual collisions, which necessitates shifting coalitions of players. Thus, those that are "for" and "against" change with each successive issue.

Model United Nations
While reacting games and Model United Nations have many similarities (e.g. educational usage, roles, factions, voting) Model UN simulations frequently focus on a fictional, rather than a historical scenario.

Historical simulation games
Historical simulation games are designed to model historical events.  Both tabletop and electronic forms can be used in classes with the intent to challenge students to work through difficult scenarios and explore possible alternate historical outcomes.  Reacting games may contain components of historical simulation games including random events and alternate historical outcomes, however, they are more typically focused around the clash of ideas and people than the direct modeling of military or historical events.

Economics simulation games
Economic simulations are commonly used in economics courses to model the outcomes of decisions made by groups of students in competition.  Reacting games may include aspects of economic simulations: for example, the acid rain and the European environment game incorporates pollution credit trading as a primary game mechanism.

Assessment
Psychological studies of students participating in reacting games have shown students to gain an "elevated self-esteem and empathy, a more external locus of control, and greater endorsement of the belief that human characteristics are malleable compared with controls." Additional assessments are being conducted to gauge science content learning in some reacting games. Studies of reacting games played online (rather than face-to-face) show similar learning gains but lower student satisfaction.

There has been little critique for the time being of reacting games. While there has been a great deal of enthusiasm for the methodology, much of that is in opposition to traditional lectures. Some students prefer a game format to traditional lecturing, but not all. The question of learning style as well as the oft-neglected teaching style should be taken into account. In the past, new methodologies have frequently been met with great enthusiasm initially, only to eventually confront realities of the classroom learning environment. The games do not lend themselves to all course material. Also, if students are exposed to too many games, it is likely there would be a "boredom" effect, perhaps as strong – if not even stronger – than that which may exist for some students to traditional lecture courses.

In September 2019, the Chronicle of Higher Education published a profile of Reacting to the Past, discussing its popularity as well as the debate surrounding the "idiosyncratic" pedagogy.

Published Reacting games
Reacting games are published by W. W. Norton & Company or by Reacting Consortium Press, an imprint of University of North Carolina Press.

As of November 2019, the following is a complete list of all published Reacting games:

 Building the Italian Renaissance: Brunelleschi's Dome and the Florence Cathedral
 Changing the Game: Title IX, Gender, and College Athletics
 Charles Darwin, the Copley Medal, and the Rise of Naturalism, 1861-1864
 Confucianism and the Succession Crisis of the Wanli Emperor, 1587
Constantine and the Council of Nicaea: Defining Orthodoxy and Heresy in Christianity, 325 CE
 Defining a Nation: India on the Eve of Independence, 1945
Environmental Science and International Politics: Acid Rain in Europe, 1979-1989, and Climate Change in Copenhagen, 2009
Europe on the Brink, 1914: The July Crisis
Forest Diplomacy: Cultures in Conflict on the Pennsylvania Frontier, 1757
Frederick Douglass, Slavery, and the Constitution, 1845
Greenwich Village, 1913: Suffrage, Labor, and the New Woman
 Henry VIII and the Reformation Parliament
Kentucky, 1861: Loyalty, State, and Nation
Mexico in Revolution, 1912-1920
Modernism versus Traditionalism: Art in Paris, 1888-1889
Patriots, Loyalists, and Revolution in New York City, 1775-1776
Red Clay, 1835: Cherokee Removal and the Meaning of Sovereignty
Restoring the World, 1945: Security and Empire at Yalta
 Rousseau, Burke, and Revolution in France, 1791
The Collapse of Apartheid and the Dawn of Democracy in South Africa, 1993
The Constitutional Convention of 1787: Constructing the American Republic
The Needs of Others: Human Rights, International Organizations, and Intervention in Rwanda, 1994
 The Threshold of Democracy: Athens in 403 B.C. (by Josiah Ober and Mark C. Carnes)
The Trial of Anne Hutchinson: Liberty, Law, and Intolerance in Puritan New England
The Trial of Galileo: Aristotelianism, the "New Cosmology," and the Catholic Church, 1616-1633

BLORG 
Scholars at many universities around the world write Reacting games. The Reacting Consortium maintains a Big List of Reacting Games (BLORG), listing many dozens of unpublished Reacting games according to five levels of development:

 Level One: Concept (no playable prototype)
 Level Two: Basic Prototype
 Level Three: Complete Prototype
 Level Four: Approved for Publication
 Level Five: Published

Notes and references
Notes

References

External links
 Reacting to the Past at Barnard College
Reacting Consortium Library
 Big List of Reacting Games
 STEM Reacting Games

Educational Games